John Joseph "J.J." Harper (December 30, 1951 – March 9, 1988) was a Canadian aboriginal leader from Wasagamack, Manitoba, who was shot and killed by Winnipeg police constable Constable Robert Cross on March 9, 1988. That event, along with the murder of Helen Betty Osborne, sparked the Aboriginal Justice Inquiry.

During an altercation between Police and Harper, Cross shot and killed Harper. It was initially ruled an accident; however, a strong public outcry lead to the Native American Justice Inquiry. The inquiry eventually concluded that Cross had used excessive force in the fatal confrontation.

Personal life
Harper was a member of the Wasagamack First Nation. He was also executive director of the Island Lake Tribal Council and a leader in Manitoba's indigenous community. He and his wife Lois had three children together. On August 2, 2008, over 20 years after Harper was killed, his nephew Craig McDougall was also shot and killed by Winnipeg Police.

Legacy
Harper's shooting was described in a 1999 book, Cowboys & Indians: The Killing of J.J. Harper, written by Winnipeg Free Press columnist Gordon Sinclair Jr., and later a 2003 television movie by the same name. It was directed by Norma Bailey and starred Adam Beach as Harper.

References

1951 births
1988 deaths
20th-century First Nations people
Indigenous leaders in Manitoba
Killings by law enforcement officers in Canada
Oji-Cree people
People shot dead by law enforcement officers in Canada